The Battle of Wólka Węglowa was a battle near Wólka Węglowa (near Warsaw) on September 19, 1939, during the last stages of the Polish counteroffensive (Battle of the Bzura) of the Invasion of Poland.

Outcome

The battle of Wólka Węglowa was a cavalry battle, as Polish Uhlan cavalry (14th Regiment of Jazlowiec Uhlans of Podolska Cavalry Brigade and elements of the 9th Regiment of Lesser Poland Uhlans) retreating towards Warsaw encountered German units. The commanding officer of the 14th Regiment, Col. Edward Godlewski ordered a cavalry charge. German infantry was taken by surprise, but machine guns and tanks hidden nearby opened fire on the cavalry. Eventually Polish units broke through towards Warsaw, as intended, but at the cost of heavy losses (105 killed, 100 wounded - about 20% of their initial strength).

The battle was witnessed and described by the Italian war correspondent Mario Appelius.

See also 

 List of World War II military equipment of Poland
 List of German military equipment of World War II

References

Sources
 Krzysztof Komorowski, Boje Polski 1939, Przewodnik encyklopedyczny.
 
 

Wolka Weglowa
Warsaw Voivodeship (1919–1939)
Polish cavalry